Billys Branch (also known as Billy Branch) is a stream in eastern Crawford and western Washington counties of the U.S. state of Missouri. It is a tributary of Courtois Creek.

The confluence is approximately one mile northwest of Berryuman.

Billys Branch was named after an unknown person with the first name Billy.

See also
List of rivers of Missouri

References

Rivers of Crawford County, Missouri
Rivers of Washington County, Missouri
Rivers of Missouri